Anita Fetz (born 19 March 1957 in Basel) is a Swiss politician of the Social Democratic Party of Switzerland (SP)  and a former member of the National Council and the Council of States in Switzerland.

Early life and education 
After graduating from the Gymnasium in Münchenstein, Basel Landschaft, Fetz studied history at the Universities of Basel and Berlin and works as an independent management consultant. In 1986 she founded the company femmedia which supports the personal development process in companies.

Professional career 
She was a founding member of the  Alternative Bank in Switzerland and between 1990 until 1997 a member of its board of directors. She was also a member of the Bank Council of the Basler Kantonalbank and of the board of directors of the Bank Cler. She is also currently the owner of femmedia. In 2019 she became a member of the board of directors of the Swiss Central Real Estate.

Political career 
As a member of the Progressive Organizations of Switzerland (POCH), she was a member of the Grand Council of Basel-Stadt between 1984 and 1989 and of the National Council from 1985 until 1990.  In 1995 she joined the SP and was again a member of the Grand Council from 1997 to 2004 and a member of the National Council for the SP between 1999 and 2003. From 2003 onwards until 2019, she was a member of the Council of States for the Canton of Basel-Stadt. In February 2012, Fetz was elected together with Roger Nordmann as Vice President of the SP parliamentary group in the Federal Assembly. In 2019 she was succeeded by Eva Herzog in the Council of States.

Works 

 My Baasel

Personal life 
Anita Fetz lives in a partnership and has her place of origin in Basel, Domat, Ems in Grisons and Gelterkinden in Basel-Landschaft. She formulated her own ten commandments for women, and with her dressing style she created some controversies at the time as in high school she was against the ban on trousers for young women, and in parliament she appeared with a T-shirt.

References 

1957 births
Politicians from Basel-Stadt
Members of the National Council (Switzerland)
Members of the Council of States (Switzerland)
Living people
21st-century Swiss women politicians
21st-century Swiss politicians